The 1997–98 Fussball Club Basel 1893 season was their 105th season since the club's foundation. René C. Jäggi was the club's chairman following the annual general meeting the year before. FC Basel played their home games in the St. Jakob Stadium. Following their promotion in the 1993–94 season this was their fourth consecutive season in the highest tier of Swiss football.

Overview

Pre-season
Jörg Berger was appointed as the new trainer at the start of the season, but in October 1997 he was sacked and was replaced by Salvatore Andracchio (ad interim) until Guy Mathez was appointed as trainer from 1 January 1998. The club's priority aim was to remain in the top flight of Swiss football.

The club made many new signings as the season started. Amongst these, there were many experienced players, such as Oliver Kreuzer from Bayern Munich, Marco Sas from Bradford City, Maurizio Gaudino from Eintracht Frankfurt, Jürgen Hartmann from Hamburger SV and Nestor Subiat from Grasshopper Club. There were also young players such as Marco Pérez from Vaduz, Jan Berger from Grasshopper Club and Fabinho Santos from Joinville (Brazil) as well as Luís Calapes and Alexander Frei from the club's own youth section.

Goalkeeper Thomas Grüter retired from professional football. Many other players also left the club, under them Mariano Armentano who transferred to Vélez Sarsfield, Adrian Falub who returned to Universitatea Cluj and Alex Nyarko who transferred to Karlsruher SC. The loan contracts with Franco Foda and Markus Schupp came to an end and because Basel did not opt to buy them, they both moved on to Sturm Graz. The youngsters Bruno Sutter transferred to Zürich and Hakan Yakin transferred to Grasshopper Club. At the end of the transfer window two further players left the squad, last season's top scorer Gaetano Giallanza transferred to Nantes in September and Jean-Pierre La Placa signed for Toulouse also in September.

In the pre-season friendly games Basel first played against a Regional 11 of local players in Alsace and then against a Regional 11 of local players from BS/BL. Basel then played in the Sempione Cup, which was a club tournament played in summer at Sportanlage Moos, Balsthal, during the years 1987 to 2004. Curiosity, in both Basel games, semi-final and third place match, the decision fell in a penalty shoot-out. The semi-final was undecided after five penalties each and had to be continued. In the end all 22 players including the goalkeepers hat to shoot a penalty. Both goalkeeps missed their penalty shot and eventually Basel lost the shoot-out 9–10. The third placed match need 14 penalties for the decision and Basel won this shoot-out 5–4. Another curiosity in the mid-season friendly against amateur club FC Rothrist. Basel won the game 13–2. Alexander Frei scored six goals and all six in the first half and Maurizio Gaudino scored five goals, all five in the second half.

Domestic league
The football league season did not start the way that head-coach Berger had hoped. Four of the first six games ended in a defeat, the team conceding 12 goals and scoring just three. Berger was put under pressure by the club's board of directors, but things did not improve. After six consecutive defeats, a period during which Giallanza and La Placa both left, Berger was sacked. He was replaced ad interim by trainer Salvatore Andracchio, who had helped out the previous season. The team managed to improve their results, but could not correct the slip into the Relegation Group.

During the winter break Guy Mathez was appointed as new head-coach. Soon after this the newly signed Nemtsoudis left the club and Nestor Subiat's loan contract was ended and the contract with Marco Sas was dissolved. Under new trainer Mathez, the first few games were good. But after a period with three away defeats and two home draws, it seemed that the team were heading for relegation. A dramatic finish with three straight victories over the three better placed teams Young Boys, SC Kriens and finally Solothurn saved Basel from the relegation drop. They finished the promotion/relegation group with six wins, four draws and four defeats. They had scored 27 goals and conceded 22.

Swiss Cup
Basel entered the Swiss Cup with a bye in the third and fourth principal round and started in the fifth. The opponents here were lower tier SC Buochs. Despite an early lead through Dario Zuffi, a penalty and a goal just after half time gave the lower tier a lead. Basel were down 1–2 right up until the 86th minute. Then Nestor Subiat poked the ball into the goal out of the crowd of players who had gathered in the six yard box, the equalizer. In the extra period Basel had no further problems and the Buochs players had no more stamina. Two more Subiat goals, two from Adrian Knup and the final goal from Fabrice Henry was followed by the final whistle.

In the round of 16 Basel's opponents were Xamax, who were stronger and won by two goals to nil. The cup final was played between Lausanne-Sport and St. Gallen, this ended with a two all draw after extra time. Lausanne won the penalty shoot out winning the trophy and qualifying for the 1998–99 UEFA Cup Winners' Cup.

Players 
The following is the list of the Basel first team squad. It also includes all players that were in the squad on the day the season started on 5 July 1997 but subsequently left the club after that date. Players who left the squad in the off-season are listed below.

 
 
 
 
 
 
 
 
 
 
 
 
 
 
 
 

 
 
 
 
 
 
 
 
 
 
 
 
 
 
 
 

Players who left the squad

Results 
Legend

Friendly matches

Pre- and mid-season

Winter break

Nationalliga A

Qualifying Phase

League table

Promotion/relegation group

League table

Swiss Cup

See also
 History of FC Basel
 List of FC Basel players
 List of FC Basel seasons

References

Sources
 Rotblau: Jahrbuch Saison 2015/2016. Publisher: FC Basel Marketing AG. 
 Rotblau: Jahrbuch Saison 2017/2018. Publisher: FC Basel Marketing AG. 
 Die ersten 125 Jahre / 2018. Publisher: Josef Zindel im Friedrich Reinhardt Verlag, Basel. 
 1997–98 Verein "Basler Fussballarchiv” homepage
 1997–98 at Joggeli.ch
 1997–98 at RSSSF

External links
 FC Basel official site

FC Basel seasons
Basel